Pederasty or paederasty ( or ) is a sexual relationship between an adult man and a boy. The term pederasty is primarily used to refer to historical practices of certain cultures, particularly ancient Greece and ancient Rome.

In most countries today such relationships are illegal. The local age of consent determines whether a person is considered legally competent to consent to sexual acts, and whether such contact is child sexual abuse or statutory rape. An adult engaging in sexual activity with a minor may be considered abusive by medical authorities for a variety of reasons, including the age of the minor, the likelihood of the minor developing one or more mental disorders, such as post-traumatic stress disorder, physical injury to the minor, and the minor's propensity for further victimization in adulthood.

Etymology and usage 
Late Latin pæderasta was borrowed in the 16th century directly from Plato's classical Greek in The Symposium. (Latin transliterates  as æ.) The word first appeared in the English language during the Renaissance, as pæderastie (e.g. in Samuel Purchas' Pilgrimes), in the sense of sexual relations between men and boys.

The Oxford English Dictionary defines it as "Homosexual relations between a man and a boy; homosexual anal intercourse, usually with a boy or younger man as the passive partner".

History

Ancient Greece 

Pederasty in ancient Greece was a socially acknowledged romantic relationship between an adult male (the erastes) and a younger male (the eromenos), usually in his teens. It was characteristic of the Archaic and Classical periods. The influence of pederasty on Greek culture of these periods was so pervasive that it has been called "the principal cultural model for free relationships between citizens."

Some scholars locate its origin in initiation ritual, particularly rites of passage on Crete, where it was associated with entrance into military life and the religion of Zeus.  It has no formal existence in the Homeric epics, and seems to have developed in the late 7th century BC as an aspect of Greek homosocial culture, which was characterized also by athletic and artistic nudity, delayed marriage for aristocrats, symposia, and the social seclusion of women.
Pederasty was both idealized and criticized in ancient literature and philosophy.  The argument has recently been made that idealization was universal in the Archaic period; criticism began in Athens as part of the general Classical Athenian reassessment of Archaic culture.

Scholars have debated the role or extent of pederasty, which is likely to have varied according to local custom and individual inclination. Athenian law, for instance, recognized both consent and age as factors in regulating sexual behavior.

Enid Bloch argues that many Greek boys in these relationships may have been traumatized by knowing that they were violating social customs, since the "most shameful thing that could happen to any Greek male was penetration by another male." She further argues that vases showing "a boy standing perfectly still as a man reaches out for his genitals" indicate the boy may have been "psychologically immobilized, unable to move or run away." One vase shows a young man or boy running away from Eros, the Greek god of desire.

Ancient Rome 

In Latin, mos Graeciae or mos Graecorum ("Greek custom" or "the way of the Greeks") refers to a variety of behaviors the ancient Romans regarded as Greek, including but not confined to sexual practice.  Homosexual behaviors at Rome were acceptable only within an inherently unequal relationship; male Roman citizens retained their masculinity as long as they took the active, penetrating role, and the appropriate male sexual partner was a prostitute or slave, who would nearly always be non-Roman. In Archaic and classical Greece, paiderasteia had been a formal social relationship between freeborn males; taken out of context and refashioned as the luxury product of a conquered people, pederasty came to express roles based on domination and exploitation. Slaves often were given, and prostitutes sometimes assumed Greek names regardless of their ethnic origin; the boys (pueri) to whom the poet Martial is attracted have Greek names. The use of slaves defined Roman pederasty; sexual practices were "somehow 'Greek when they were directed at "freeborn boys openly courted in accordance with the Hellenic tradition of pederasty".

Effeminacy or a lack of discipline in managing one's sexual attraction to another male threatened a man's "Roman-ness" and thus might be disparaged as "Eastern" or "Greek". Fears that Greek models might "corrupt" traditional Roman social codes (the mos maiorum) seem to have prompted a vaguely documented law (Lex Scantinia) that attempted to regulate aspects of homosexual relationships between freeborn males and to protect Roman youth from older men emulating Greek customs of pederasty. 

Theologian Edith Humphrey commented that "the Graeco-Roman 'ideal' regarding homosexuality entailed erotic love, not of children, but of young (teenage) males of the same age that a young woman would be given in marriage, and that frequently the more mature male was only slightly older than the partner."

Modern view 

In the modern world, an adult engaging in sexual activity with a minor may be considered child sexual abuse or statutory rape, depending upon the local age of consent. Age of consent laws exist because minors are considered incapable of meaningfully consenting to sexual activity until they reach a certain age. Prepubescent and adolescent children are not socially equal to adults, and abusers emotionally manipulate the children they victimize. These laws aim to give the minor some protection against predatory or exploitative sexual interaction with adults.

The effects of child sexual abuse can include depression, post-traumatic stress disorder, anxiety, complex post-traumatic stress disorder, propensity to further victimization in adulthood, and physical injury to the child, among other problems.

Modern sexual abusers who prefer boys may describe themselves as "boy lovers", and sometimes appeal to practices in Ancient Greece as a justification.

See also 

 Bacha bazi
 Catamite
 Greek love
 History of erotic depictions
 History of homosexuality
 History of human sexuality
 Homoeroticism
 Homosexuality in ancient Greece
 Homosexuality in ancient Rome
 Homosexuality in China
 Homosexuality in India
 Homosexuality in Japan
 Intercrural sex
 Kagema
 Köçek
 List of pedophile and pederast advocacy organizations
 North American Man/Boy Love Association
 Pederasty in ancient Greece
 Sexuality in ancient Rome
 Wakashū

References

External links 

 
Child sexual abuse
Chronophilia
LGBT history
LGBT and society
Violence against children
Violence against men